Ivonne Aline Bordelois (born 5 November 1934), is an Argentine poet, essayist, and linguist.

Career
She worked at the magazine Sur and conducted interviews and publications with Alejandra Pizarnik for various national and international publications.

In 1968 she received a scholarship from the National Scientific and Technical Research Council (CONICET) and moved to Boston to study at the Massachusetts Institute of Technology. There she received her doctorate in linguistics in 1974, with Noam Chomsky as the director of her thesis. From 1975 to 1988 she held a chair of linguistics at the Ibero-American Institute of Utrecht University, obtained through international competition. In 1982 she received a Guggenheim Fellowship. In 2004 she received the Konex Award Merit Diploma in the Literary Essay category, and served on the award's jury in 2006, 2014, and 2016. In 2005 she was awarded the La Nación- prize for her essay El país que nos habla.

Works
 
 
 
 
 
 
 
  Co-author with Fabio Grementieri.
 
 
 
  Co-author with Cristina Piña.

References

1934 births
20th-century Argentine poets
20th-century Argentine women writers
20th-century Argentine writers
21st-century Argentine poets
21st-century Argentine women writers
21st-century Argentine writers
Linguists from Argentina
Argentine women essayists
Argentine essayists
Argentine women poets
Living people
MIT School of Humanities, Arts, and Social Sciences alumni
People from Buenos Aires Province
University of Buenos Aires alumni
University of Paris alumni
Academic staff of Utrecht University
Women linguists
Argentine expatriates in France